James William Cecil Turner (2 October 1886–29 November 1968) was an English first-class cricketer who played 46 matches for Worcestershire either side of the First World War, as well as appearing twice for H. K. Foster's XI.

Cricket career
Turner made his debut for Worcestershire against Essex at Amblecote on 31 July 1911, scoring 27 and 11 in a crushing innings-and-228-run defeat.
A further five appearances that season brought Turner little success, and nor did a handful more the following season. In 1913 he played a solitary match for H. K. Foster's XI, but he wasn't seen again in first-class cricket until after the First World War.

Turner's return to the game, against Gloucestershire at Worcester in June 1919, saw him make his first half-century: he hit 72 in the second innings of a drawn match.
However, he did not again pass 30 that season, although he did pick up the first of his two first-class wickets when he accounted for Warwickshire's Frederick Santall at Worcester at the end of August.

1920 saw Turner both hit another half-century — 85 against Warwickshire in August
— and take his other wicket — that of Sussex's George Stannard.
The following year, which proved to be his last in the game, Turner scored his only century, hitting 106 against Northamptonshire, though Worcestershire suffered a 356-run defeat, which as of 2007 remains Northants' greatest-ever margin of runs victory.

Turner twice captained the Worcestershire side: against Warwickshire at Birmingham in 1919, and against Glamorgan at St Helens in 1921.

Notes

External links
Statistical summary from CricketArchive

English cricketers
Worcestershire cricketers
1886 births
1968 deaths
People from Bromley
People from Girton, Cambridgeshire